Iosif Lereter (born 23 July 1933) is a Romanian former footballer and manager.

Career
Iosif Lereter was born on 23 July 1933 in Oțelu Roșu, Romania and at the beginning of his career he played as a forward and midfielder, ending his career as a defender. He started to play football in the lower leagues of Romania at the local club from his town, Energia Oțelu Roșu in 1949. He went to play for Politehnica Timișoara where he made his debut in the Romanian top-league Divizia A on 18 August 1957 in a 2–2 against Progresul Oradea. Lereter was part of Politehnica's team that won the 1957–58 Cupa României, playing in the 1–0 victory from the final against Progresul București. In 1967 he went to play for UTA Arad, where under the guidance of coach Nicolae Dumitrescu he won two consecutive league titles, in the first he contributed with 10 goals scored in 30 appearances and in the second he scored 7 goals in 29 matches. He also made some European performances with The Old Lady as eliminating the defending European Cup champions Feyenoord in the 1970–71 European Cup season and playing 8 games in the 1971–72 UEFA Cup campaign when the team reached the quarter-finals where they were eliminated by Tottenham Hotspur who would eventually win the competition. On 16 October 1971 while playing for UTA Arad in a match against Argeș Pitești, he became the first footballer to reach 300 Divizia A appearances, that is why every time a footballer reaches 300 appearances in the Romanian top-league, the press says he entered the "Iosif Lereter Club". He made his last appearance in Divizia A on 1 October 1972, playing for UTA Arad in a 4–2 loss against Jiul Petroșani. After he ended his playing career, Lereter worked for a while as a manager at Constructorul Timișoara and UM Timișoara. In 2008 Iosif Lereter received the Honorary Citizen of Timișoara title and in 2018 in order to celebrate 60 years since the winning of the 1957–58 Cupa României, the Politehnica University of Timișoara awarded him a diploma of excellence. Iosif Lereter has a total of 327 Divizia A appearances in which he scored 79 goals and made 16 appearances in European competitions.

International career
Iosif Lereter played one game at international level for Romania when coach Ilie Oană used him in a 1966 World Cup qualification match against Czechoslovakia which ended with a 3–1 loss.

Honours
Politehnica Timișoara
Divizia B: 1959–60, 1964–65
Cupa României: 1957–58
UTA Arad
Divizia A: 1968–69, 1969–70

Notes

References

External links

Labtof profile

Living people
Romanian footballers
Romania international footballers
Association football defenders
Association football midfielders
Association football forwards
1933 births
Liga I players
Liga II players
FC Politehnica Timișoara players
FC UTA Arad players
Romanian football managers